Overcoming Autism: Finding the Answers, Strategies, and Hope That Can Transform a Child's Life  is a book that novelist Claire Scovell LaZebnik co-wrote with therapist Lynn Koegel, of the UCSB Autism Research and Training Center, in 2004.  Lynn writes about strategies for educating and working with children with autism, and Claire writes about her experience raising her autistic son.  The book includes specific advice for teaching and raising children with autism, as well as personal anecdotes of families with autistic children.

This book is non-fiction and represents a pro-applied behavior analysis point of view.  The authors advocate the use of pivotal response therapy in working with autistic children.

Chapters

Chapter One - Diagnosis: Surviving the Worst News You'll Ever Get

Chapter Two - Ending the Long Silence: Teaching Your Child to Communicate

Chapter Three - Tears, Meltdowns, Aggression, and Self-Injury: Breaking the Cycle

Chapter Four - Self-Stimulation: Flapping, Banging, Twirling, and Other Repetitive Behaviors

Chapter Five - Social Skills: Turning Language and Play into Meaningful Interactions

Chapter Six - Battling Fears and Fixations: Bringing Your Child Back to the Real World

Chapter Seven - Education: Finding the Right School Placement and Making It Even More Right

Chapter Eight - Family Life: Fighting Your Way Back to Normalcy

References

External links
 Overcoming Autism page at Claire LaZebnik Website
 The UCSB Autism Research and Training Center Home Page
 Jean Genet - Founder of Byonetics, Autism Survivor

Health and wellness books
Books about autism
Handbooks and manuals